Scalpellomorpha is an order of acorn barnacles in the class Thecostraca. There are about 11 families in 3 superfamilies and more than 450 described species in Scalpellomorpha.

Families
 Order Scalpellomorpha Buckeridge & Newman, 2006
 Superfamily Lepadoidea Chan et al., 2021
 Family Heteralepadidae Nilsson-Cantell, 1921
 Family Lepadidae Darwin, 1852
 Family Malacolepadidae Hiro, 1937
 Family Poecilasmatidae Annandale, 1909
 Family Rhizolepadidae Zevina, 1980
 Superfamily Neolepadoidea Chan et al., 2021
 Family Neobrachylepadidae Newman & Yamaguchi, 1995
 Family Neolepadidae Yamaguchi, Newman & Hashimoto, 2004
 Family Neoverrucidae Newman, 1989 in Hessler & Newman, 1989
 Family Probathylepadidae Ren & Sha, 2015
 Superfamily Scalpelloidea Chan et al., 2021
 Family Scalpellidae Pilsbry, 1907
 Family †Proverrucidae Newman, 1989 in Hessler & Newman, 1989

References

Crustacean orders